Kenneth Sivertsen (born August 31, 1973) is a Norwegian alpine skier, born in Narvik. He competed in the downhill, giant slalom  and Super-G at the Winter Olympics in Salt Lake City in 2002.

Sivertsen was Norwegian champion in alpine combined in 1996, and in downhill in 1999.

References

1973 births
Living people
Alpine skiers at the 2002 Winter Olympics
Norwegian male alpine skiers
Olympic alpine skiers of Norway
People from Narvik
Sportspeople from Nordland